Blue Jazz is the final studio album by the American jazz trumpeter Malachi Thompson released by the Delmark label in 2003.

Reception

Allmusic reviewer Thom Jurek stated "Trumpeter, composer, arranger, and bandleader Malachi Thompson has outdone himself with Blue Jazz ... Thompson and his notion of reinventing the manner in which a brass-driven big band explores the relationships between harmony and rhythm, and the more tenacious linguistic commonalities between bebop and free jazz have never been as articulately or gracefully rendered as they are in this pair of suites. The band is stellar ... The two suites, "Black Metropolis" and "Blues for a Saint Called Louis," are stunning compositions in and of themselves.  ... The spirit is raucous, joyous, and utterly sophisticated; it looks forward and back across 20 years of Thompson's own free bop amalgam, but also through the entirety of jazz history. The album is, simply put, a singular achievement and one of the great big band records in recent years, and a serious candidate for big band album of 2003". In JazzTimes John Litweiler observed "Trumpeter Thompson solos at length throughout Blue Jazz. He’s a fanciful player, a master of the lyrical side of ’50s late-bop players  ... But he cares less about hard bop’s flair and great formal sophistication-instead, his lines are diffuse, so inspired passages often jostle uninspired ideas ... There’s pleasure in Thompson’s soulful compositions and arrangements. Like his friend Lester Bowie, he presents a variety of settings for his five trumpets and four trombones, with plenty of blues and backbeats".

Track listing
All compositions BY Malachi Thompson except where noted
 "Black Metropolis" – 9:10
 "The Panther" – 6:48
 "Jaaz Revelations" – 5:33
 "Genesis / Rebirth" – 10:35
 "Po' Little Louie" – 3:41
 "Get On the Train" – 4:12
 "Blues for a Saint Called Louis" – 5:48
 "Blue Jazz" – 8:28
 "Footprints" (Wayne Shorter) – 9:12
 "Mud Hole" – 4:29

Personnel
Malachi Thompson – trumpet, flugelhorn
Gary Bartz – alto saxophone, soprano saxophone 
Billy Harper – tenor saxophone
David Spencer, Kenny Anderson, Micah Frazier, Elmer Brown – trumpet
Tracy Kirk, Steve Berry, Bill McFarland, Omar Jefferson – trombone
Kirk Brown – piano 
Harrison Bankhead  – bass
Leon Joyce Jr. – drums 
Ari Brown – tenor saxophone, clarinet (tracks 4 & 7)
Gene "Daddy G" Barge – tenor saxophone (track 10)
Dee Alexander (tracks 5, 7 & 8), The Big DooWopper (track 10) – vocals

References

Delmark Records albums
2003 albums
Malachi Thompson albums
Albums produced by Bob Koester